The 51st Infantry Regiment is a regiment of the United States Army first established in 1917.

Lineage
The 51st Infantry Regiment was constituted 15 May 1917 at Chickamauga Park, Georgia, then assigned on 16 November 1917 to the 6th Infantry Division.  It was inactivated 22 September 1921 at Camp Grant, Illinois.  It was relieved on 15 August 1927 from assignment to the 6th Division and assigned to the 9th Infantry Division; relieved 1 October 1933 from assignment to the 9th Division and assigned to the 6th Division; then relieved 16 December 1940 from assignment to the 6th Division.

The regiment was reactivated 15 April 1941 at Pine Camp, New York, as the 51st Infantry (Armored), an element of the 4th Armored Division, then redesignated 1 January 1942 as the 51st Armored Infantry.

Company F
Following World War II, Company F of the regiment was reorganized and redesignated on 1 May 1946 as Company C, 10th Constabulary Squadron, an element of the 14th Constabulary Regiment, United States Constabulary in Germany.  It was inactivated 20 December 1948 in Germany; concurrently converted and redesignated as Company C, 10th Armored Infantry Battalion, an element of the 4th Armored Division, then redesignated 25 February 1953 as Company C, 510th Armored Infantry Battalion, an element of the 4th Armored Division. The company was activated on 15 June 1954 at Fort Hood, Texas and inactivated there on 1 April 1957, Texas. Concurrently, the 510th Armored Infantry Battalion was relieved from assignment to the 4th Armored Division with the reorganization of Army combat forces into the Pentomic concept.

The lineage of Company F was redesignated on 1 July 1959 as Headquarters and Headquarters Company, 6th Battle Group, 51st Infantry but remained inactive. It was redesignated again on 11 August 1967, this time as Company F, 51st Infantry and activated on 25 September 1967 in Vietnam with the reflagging of the 196th Long Range Reconnaissance Patrol Detachment, Americal Division, The lineage of F-51st was inactivated on 26 December 1968 in Vietnam when the unit was reflagged as Company G, 75th Infantry (separate lineage and honors).

Company F was reactivated 16 December 1986 as VII Corps' Long Range Surveillance Company (LRS) in Ludwigsburg Germany at Coffey barracks attached to 511th MI, serving there until 15 November 1991, when it was inactivated. It was reactivated on 16 April 1995 as the LRS company of the 525th Military Intelligence Brigade (Airborne), Fort Bragg, North Carolina, then redesignated on 1 October 2005 as Company F, 51st Infantry Regiment. The colors were inactivated on 15 March 2009 at Fort Bragg when the company was reflagged as Troop C (LRS), 1st Squadron, 38th Cavalry Regiment, 525th Battlefield Surveillance Brigade. With this reorganization of the 525th, Troop C became the only Airborne unit in the brigade.

On 16 January 2011, the company was assigned to the 1st Brigade Combat Team, 1st Armored Division, and activated at Fort Bliss. It was inactivated on 15 November 2013 and relieved from assignment to the brigade. The company was again activated on 16 November 2014 at Fort Bragg.

Company E
Company E, 51st Infantry was active in Germany from 1986 as V Corps' Long Range Surveillance company, attached to the 165th MI BN (TE). It was formed at Wiesbaden Air Base; Wiesbaden, Germany on 16, Sept. 1986. In 1988 E co. moved to Darmstadt, Germany. Company E (LRS) saw repeated deployments to Bosnia and Kosovo and two deployments in support of the invasion and occupation of Iraq. It was inactivated in April 2007.

1st Battalion
HHC, 1st Battalion, 51st Infantry, bearing the lineage of the former Company A, 51st Infantry, was reassigned from the 4th Armored Division in 1957 to the 2d Armored Division in Germany. In 1963 the unit was reassigned to the 4th Armored Division. On 10 May 1971, the colors of the 4th Armored Division were inactivated and the unit was reflagged as the 1st Armored Division; concurrently, the 1st Battalion was assigned to the 1st Armored Division. The 1st Battalion (Mechanized), 51st Infantry; the 1st Battalion, 6th Infantry; and the 2d Battalion, 37th Armor formed the maneuver elements of the 1st Brigade, 1st Armored Division at McKee Barracks in Crailsheim. The unit salute greeting was "Fixed Bayonets."

The 1st Battalion (Mechanized), 51st Infantry was inactivated on 16 June 1984, when the 1st Armored Division converted to the Division 86 force structure. Under this structure, each heavy division decreased by one infantry battalion while remaining infantry battalions gained one additional rifle company.

On 10 April 1984 Company C, 1-51st moved from McKee Barracks to Storck Barracks, Illesheim and was reflagged as Company D,  1st Battalion, 6th Infantry.

On 24 April 1984, Company A, 1-51st moved from McKee Barracks, to Warner Barracks, Bamberg and was reflagged as Company D, 1st Battalion, 54th Infantry.

On 1 May 1984, Company B, 1-51st moved to Ferris Barracks, Erlangen and was reflagged as Company D, 2d Battalion, 6th Infantry.

Once the infantry companies moved, the battalion scout platoon moved to Storck Barracks, Illesheim and became the Scout Platoon, HHC, 1st Brigade. HHC and Combat Support Company (CSC) assets and personnel were reassigned and remaining equipment turned in or laterally transferred.

Heraldry

Coat of arms 
The regiment's crest shows a wreath of the colors (Or and Azure) a ragged tree trunk eradicated Proper. The shield is blue for Infantry, with the bend taken from the coat of arms of Alsace. The ragged tree trunk symbolizes the Meuse-Argonne operations.

Distinctive unit insignia 
 Description
A gold metal and enamel device 1 5/32 inches (2.94 cm) in height overall consisting of a shield blazoned: Azure, a bend Or. Attached below the shield a blue motto scroll inscribed "I SERVE" in gold letters.
 Symbolism
The shield is blue for Infantry, with the bend taken from the coat of arms of Alsace.

References

External links
 http://www.history.army.mil/html/forcestruc/lineages/branches/inf/default.htm
 http://www.history.army.mil/html/forcestruc/lineages/branches/div/default.htm
 https://web.archive.org/web/20110911191248/http://www.tioh.hqda.pentagon.mil/UniformedServices/crossed_musket.aspx
 https://web.archive.org/web/20040225110055/http://www.i-served.com/F51Lineage.html

051